"Fuldans" is a song performed by Swedish danceband Rolandz in Melodifestivalen 2018. The song made it to the final in Friends Arena on 10 March 2018.

Charts

References

2018 singles
English-language Swedish songs
Melodifestivalen songs of 2018
Swedish pop songs
Songs written by Fredrik Kempe